Ferdinand Ries wrote his Symphony No. 7 in A minor, Op. 181, during the spring and summer of 1835, 12 years after the composition of his Symphony No. 6 and the Sinfonie WoO 30 (Often referred to as Symphony No. 8). This is the last symphony that Ries wrote. It is Beethovenian in style, and specifically influenced by Beethovens's seventh, sixth ("Pastorale"), and third ("Eroica") symphonies.

This symphony is written in four movements and is scored for 2 Flutes, 2 Oboes, 2 Clarinets, 2 Bassoons, 4 Horns, 2 Trumpets, 3 Trombones (Alto, Tenor, and Bass), Timpani, and Strings.

Movements

 Allegro con spirito
 Larghetto con moto
 Scherzo Allegro non troppo
 Largo – Finale: Allegro vivace

Composition History
Supposedly, this symphony was a compositional commission, as Ries wrote to his brother, Joseph Ries on 9 March 1835: 
"I now want to write a symphony, which is ordered for Vienna." 
Ries appeared to have hopes about this symphony. The past few years for Ries were not the most uplifting for Ries. On 20 April Ries again wrote to his brother Joseph: 
"From my symphony, which I have in work, I promise myself a lot." So, we can see that Ries planned had a very substantial composition in mind when he wrote to his brother.
In early July Ries wrote to his brother to inform his about the beginning of the composition of the finale:
"From Vienna, a company lover has ordered a symphony with me, I am at the last Allegro, it will not be bad, I can tell you."

On 24 July he returned to the Viennese publisher Trentsensky & Vieweg with the score. The score was sold to the publisher SA Steiner, whose owner was Tobias Haslinger on 31 August. 

In 1835, Haslinger played a key role in the organization of a symphony competition, whose publicity he hoped for in the sales opportunities of his publishing products. In order to participate in this contest the composers had been invited to submit their symphonies anonymously, but with a motto of identification, "to the kk court and private art and music therapy of Mr. Tobias Haslinger in Vienna frankly", as it is called in the official tender text published in various German-language music magazines. The winners waved a prize of 50 ducats and performances of the award-winning work in the prestigious Viennese Concerts spirituels . 

Haslinger acquired the symphony by Ries with the intention of submitting it as a competition contest in order to bring a prize-winning work to the market, in the case of a prize. The copy of the symphony, which had been sent to Vienna, received a new title without the composer's name, but with the motto "I have done my own." The fact that the work was actually submitted is confirmed by the publication of keys and foreign exchange of the 57 symphonies, which were recorded in December 1835; There appears as No. 15 a symphony in A minor with the motto " I have done my own." Ries himself does not seem to have asked for his consent and only afterwards has been informed of his involuntary participation in the competition; On 16 June 1836, he wrote to Joseph Ries:

"A new symphony will soon be released. You will remember that a company lover in Vienna ordered a symphony in Vienna last summer. I am now, to my great surprise, that Haslinger, who has always given me so bad a position, that I could never sell him a MS Wanted: / this Sinf: bought from these lovers to themselves and also entered the price work for symphonies. What you do not experience!"

The hope of the publication of the symphony was in vain; In January 1836 the jury had already announced the prize-winner, Franz Lachner, and some of the mention of particularly worthy compositions [8 ]; The symphony of Ries was not among them [9 ]; And Haslinger may no longer had been interested in its publication. This last symphony by Ferdinand Ries remained unpublished until 1982; Nothing is known about a performance. Ries himself seems to have refrained from his initial optimism with regard to the work.

This symphony was not published in Ries's time and no performances are known. The only recording of this work served as its world premiere.

Ries's symphonies were numbered, on the whole, in order, not of composition, but of publication and/or first performance in England. The publisher Schuberth also applied op.181 to Ries's Introduction et Rondeau à la Zingaresco for piano published in 1838. The 1860s Abschrift parts (manuscript copy) held at the Staatsbibliothek zu Berlin use Op.181 to describe the symphony.

Recordings
The only recording that has been made is by Howard Griffiths conducting the Zürcher Kammerorchester.

References

Bibliography
 
 Hill, Cecil (1982). Three Symphonies: 1, 3, 8 (Ries). New York: Garland Publications. .
 RISM Description of 1860s Abschrift Parts of the 7th Symphony
 http://bert-hagels.de/ries181.htm

07
Ries 07
1835 compositions
Compositions in A minor